There are over 9,000 Grade I listed buildings in England. This page is a list of these buildings in the district of Exeter in Devon.

Exeter

|}

See also
Grade II* listed buildings in Exeter

Notes

External links

Lists of Grade I listed buildings in Devon
Grade I listed buildings in Devon
Buildings and structures in Exeter